Stargazer is the eighth album by jazz trumpeter Dave Douglas. It was released in 1997 on Arabesque Records. The album features performances by Douglas, Chris Speed, Josh Roseman, Uri Caine, James Genus and Joey Baron, and includes Douglas' interpretations of three compositions by Wayne Shorter.

Reception
The Allmusic review by David R. Adler states "Douglas's writing and playing are highly unpredictable and emotionally rich. His remarkable sextet delivers every note with conviction and finesse". On All About Jazz Glenn Astarita said "With Stargazer, Dave Douglas has quickly established himself as one of the premier trumpet masters of the 90's... This release ranks among Douglas' most inspired work — fine craftsman with amazing chops yet an extremely versatile and musician. The future of jazz seems bright with the advent of Dave Douglas' vision. Highly recommended".

Track listing
All compositions by Dave Douglas except as indicated
 "Spring Ahead" - 4:24
 "Goldfish" -  10:28
 "Stargazer" - 6:39
 "Four Sleepers" - 10:23
 "On The Milky Way Express" (Shorter) -  4:12
 "Pug Nose" (Shorter) - 4:41
 "Dark Sky" - 5:53
 "Intuitive Science" - 8:49
 "Diana" (Shorter) - 4:32
Recorded on December 30, 1996

Personnel
Dave Douglas: trumpet
Chris Speed: tenor saxophone, clarinet
Joshua Roseman: trombone
Uri Caine: piano
James Genus: bass
Joey Baron: drums

References 

1997 albums
Dave Douglas (trumpeter) albums
Arabesque Records albums